The 2021 Al Habtoor Tennis Challenge was a women's professional tennis tournament played on outdoor hard courts. It was the twenty-fourth edition of the tournament which was part of the 2021 ITF Women's World Tennis Tour. It took place in Dubai, United Arab Emirates between 22 and 28 November 2021.

Singles main-draw entrants

Seeds

 1 Rankings are as of 15 November 2021.

Other entrants
The following players received wildcards into the singles main draw:
  Anna Danilina
  Weronika Falkowska
  Lina Glushko
  Sandra Samir

The following player received entry using a protected ranking:
  Vitalia Diatchenko

The following players received entry from the qualifying draw:
  Naiktha Bains
  Kateryna Bondarenko
  Ilona Georgiana Ghioroaie
  Julia Grabher
  Andreea Mitu
  Oksana Selekhmeteva
  Isabella Shinikova
  Aldila Sutjiadi

Champions

Singles

  Daria Snigur def.  Kristína Kučová, 6–3, 6–0

Doubles

  Anna Danilina /  Viktória Kužmová def.  Angelina Gabueva /  Anastasia Zakharova, 4–6, 6–3, [10–2]

References

External links
 2021 Al Habtoor Tennis Challenge at ITFtennis.com
 Official website

2020
2021 ITF Women's World Tennis Tour
2021 in Emirati tennis
November 2021 sports events in the United Arab Emirates